The Commercial Union Assurance Building is a , 16-story office building located in the Financial District of San Francisco, California. The building was completed in 1921 and is the same height of the San Francisco City Hall.  The much taller 555 California Street is to the west of this Renaissance Revival styled building.

See also

List of tallest buildings in San Francisco

References

Financial District, San Francisco
Skyscraper office buildings in San Francisco
Office buildings completed in 1921